Chrysolina grossa, the red leaf beetle, is a species of broad-shouldered leaf beetles belonging to the family Chrysomelidae, subfamily Chrysomelinae.

Subspecies
Species within this genus include:
Chrysolina grossa chloromaura  (Olivier, 1807)
Chrysolina grossa grossa (Fabricius, 1792)
Chrysolina grossa tingitana (Escalera, 1914)

Distribution

This species is mainly found in France, Italy, Spain and former Yugoslavia.

Description
Head and pronotum show metallic blue-green colours, while elytra are bright red. It can be distinguished from Chrysomela populi for its longer antennae and wider pronotum.

Biology
It feeds on wild plants of the Lamiaceae species.

References

 Daccordi, M., 1982 - Chrysomelinae in:Seeno, T.N. & Wilcox, J.A., Leaf beetle genera (Coleoptera: Chrysomelidae) - Entomography Publications, Sacramento

External links
 Chrysomelidae of Europe
 INPN

Chrysomelinae
Beetles of Europe
Taxa named by Johan Christian Fabricius
Beetles described in 1792